The 1982 Penn State Nittany Lions football team represented Pennsylvania State University during the 1982 NCAA Division I-A football season.  Penn State defeated the Georgia Bulldogs, 27–23, in the Sugar Bowl to win Joe Paterno's first consensus national championship. The team was selected national champion by AP, Billingsley, DeVold, Dunkel, FACT, FB News, Football Research, FW, Litkenhous, Matthews, NCF, NFF, The New York Times, Poling, Sagarin, Sagarin (ELO-Chess), Sporting News, UPI/coaches, and USA/CNN, while named co-champion by Helms.

Schedule

Roster

Rankings

AP Poll

UPI Poll

Game summaries

Temple

Maryland

Rutgers

#2 Nebraska

#4 Alabama

Syracuse

#13 West Virginia

Boston College

North Carolina State

#13 Notre Dame

#5 Pittsburgh

#1 Georgia (Sugar Bowl)

Awards
Todd Blackledge
Davey O'Brien Award
Joe Paterno
Eddie Robinson Coach of the Year
Pete Speros
Nittany Lion of the Year

NFL Draft
Nine Nittany Lions were drafted in the 1983 NFL Draft.

Media

Radio

References

Penn State
Penn State Nittany Lions football seasons
College football national champions
Sugar Bowl champion seasons
Lambert-Meadowlands Trophy seasons
Penn State Nittany Lions football